Crocus (plural: crocuses or croci) is a genus of seasonal flowering plants in the family Iridaceae (iris family) comprising about 100 species of perennials growing from corms. They are low growing plants, whose flower stems remain underground, that bear relatively large white, yellow, orange or purple flowers and then become dormant after flowering. Many are cultivated for their flowers, appearing in autumn, winter, or spring. The flowers close at night and in overcast weather conditions. The crocus has been known throughout recorded history, mainly as the source of saffron. Saffron is obtained from the dried stigma of Crocus sativus, an autumn-blooming species. It is valued as a spice and dyestuff, and is one of the most expensive spices in the world. Iran is the center of saffron production. Crocuses are native to woodland, scrub, and meadows from sea level to alpine tundra from the Mediterranean, through North Africa, central and southern Europe, the islands of the Aegean, the Middle East and across Central Asia to Xinjiang in western China. Crocuses may be propagated from seed or from daughter cormels formed on the corm, that eventually produce mature plants. They arrived in Europe from Turkey in the 16th century and became valued as an ornamental flowering plant.

Description

General
Crocus display the general characteristics of family Iridaceae, which include basal cauline (arising from the aerial stem) leaves that sheath the stem base, hermaphrodite flowers that are relatively large and showy, the perianth petaloid with 2 whorls of 3 tepals each and septal nectaries. The flowers have 3 stamens and a gynoecium of 3 united carpels and an inferior ovary, 3 locules and axile placentation with fruit that is a loculicidal capsule.

Crocus is an acaulescent (lacking a visible lower stem above ground) diminutive seasonal cormous (growing from corms) herbaceous perennial geophytic genus. The corms are symmetrical and globose or oblate (round in shape with flatted tops and bottoms), and are covered with tunic leaves that are fibrous, membranous or coriaceous (leathery). The corms produce fibrous roots, and contractile roots which adjust the corms depth in the soil, which maybe pulled as deep as  into the soil.The roots appear randomly from the lower part of the corm, but in a few species, from a basal ridge.

Leaves
Plants produce several basal linear bifacial green leaves that arise from the corms. These are adaxially (upper surface facing axis) flat or channelled with pale median stripes, while the opposite (abaxial) surface is strongly keeled, with two grooves on either side. The leaves have a distinctive shape in cross-section, being boat-shaped with two lateral arms with margins recurved inwardly towards the central ridged keel, forming the sides of the "boat". The keel may be square or rectangular, but is lacking in C. carpetanus. The pale central stripe is caused by parenchymatous cells which lack chloroplasts and may contain air spaces. The leaf-like bracts are membranous, while the smaller bracteoles are either membranous or absent. The leaf bases are surrounded by up to 5 membranous sheaths called cataphylls, a specialised leaf. The bases of the cataphylls form the corm tunic, and their number varies from 3 to 6, and enclose the true leaves (euphylls), bracts, bracteoles and flowering stalk.

Flowers
The number of peduncles (flower stems) vary from one to several and remain underground, emerging only at the fruiting stage, bearing flowers that are solitary or several, so that a true scape is absent. The flowers are pedicellate (attached to the peduncle by a short subterranean pedicel stalk). The pedicel is sometimes subtended (below pedicel) by a membranous, sheathing prophyll (leaf-like structure).

The showy, salver to cup-shaped, single or clustered actinomorphic flowers taper off into a narrow tube; the flowers emerge from the ground, and can be white, yellow, lilac to dark purple, or variegated in cultivars. The flower tube is long, cylindrical and slender, expanding apically. The floral tube is long and narrow with 6 lobes in 2 whorls. The perianth is 3+3 (3 sepals+3petals) and gamophyllous (with fused segments). The tepal whorls are similar, equal or subequal with a smaller inner whorl, and cupped to outspread. The bracts are membranous, but the inner ones are sometimes lacking.

The 3 stamens are erect and linear and inserted in the throat of the perianth tube, with anthers shorter than the filaments. Pollen grains are inaperturate (apertures absent) but sometimes spiraperturate (spiral shaped). Each flower has a single style which is exserted (projecting beyond the corolla tube) and slender distally with three to many branches. The branches are highly variable, being short or long, and simple, bifurcate (dividing in two) or multifid and sometimes distally flattened. The inferior ovary has 3 carpels with axile placentation. It remains underground, and as the seeds ripen, the pedicel (stem of the flower) grows longer - so the fruit is above the soil surface.

Fruit and seed
The fruit is a small membranous  capsule, ellipsoid or oblong-ellipsoid in shape and the many seeds are globose to ellipsoid. The seed surface is highly variable, including papillate (covered in small protuberances), digitiform (finger-like) and other epidermal cell types. In some species the seeds are arillate, with fleshy appendages. Crocus seeds have both inner and outer integuments and in some species the outer epidermis may display long papillae. Embryo-sac development is Polygonum type. Dehiscence (splitting of the capsule to release the seed) is of the loculicidal type in which it splits through the wall of the locules leaving the septa that separate them intact.

Karyology
Crocus has extensive aneuploidy (abnormal number of chromosomes), with some uncertainty as to the base number of chromosomes. The chromosome numbers shows extreme variability, ranging from 2n=6 to 2n=70 even within a single species.

Phytochemistry
The Iridaceae contain a wide range of phenolic compounds. However, 6-Hydroxyflavones are found only in Crocus, which is also characterised by the presence of crocins, water-soluble yellow carotenoids, in the floral tissues. Crocin is a diester of crocetin, responsible for the colour of the styles and stigma of C. sativus, and hence saffron.

While the flowers may vary dramatically between species, there is little variation in the leaves, but sufficient variability in corm tunics that they may be used as an aid in differentiating taxa.

{| style="background-color:transparent; margin-left: auto; margin-right: auto;" 
|-valign="middle"
|
|
|-
|}

Taxonomy

History 

The crocus was well known to the ancients, being described at least as early as Theophrastus (c. 371c. 287 BC), and was introduced into Britain by the Romans, where the saffron crocus was used as a dyestuff. It was reintroduced into Western Europe by the Crusaders. The crocus is mentioned in mediaeval and later herbals, one of the earliest being the 14th century Tractatus de Herbis. William Turner (1548) states that the crocus is referred to as saffron in English, implying that only C. sativus was known at that time. However, by 1597 John Gerard writes of "sundry sorts" and uses the term saffron and crocus as interchangeable. He included both spring and autumn flowering crocus, but distinguished Wild Saffron (Crocus) from Meadow Saaffron (Colchicum). He described eleven forms. Some of his specimens were obtained from Clusius. In the following century, John Parkinson in a more detailed account was more careful to include separate chapters for Colchicum, with the common name of meadow saffron, from Crocus or saffron. Parkinson (1656) states that there are "divers sorts of saffrons" describing 27 spring flowering plants and 4 autumn flowering ones, pointing out that only one of those was the true saffron crocus, which he called Crocus verus sativus autumnalis. Similar accounts are found in continental European herbals, including those of l'Obel in Flanders (1576) and Besler's Hortus Eystettensis in Bavaria (1613).

The genus Crocus was first formally described by Linnaeus in 1753, with three taxa, and two species, C. sativus (type species), var. officinalis (now treated as a synonym of C. sativus) and var. vernus (now C. vernus) and C. bulbocodium (now Romulea bulbocodium). Thus Linnaeus recognised two taxa that are accepted as separate species in modern classifications, one vernal and one autumnal crocus, but incorrectly assumed they were  only varieties of a single species, while his second species was actually from a closely related genus that was only recognised later (1772). However a subsequent re-examination of Linnaeus's specimens suggested the presence of several different species that he did not recognise as being separate. Linnaeus' system, based on sexual characteristics, Crocus was classified as Triandra Monogynia (Three stamens, Single pistil). Linnaeus's system was supplanted by the "natural" system which used a hierarchy of taxonomic ranks based on weighting of the importance of structural characteristics of the plant. Jussieu  (1789) placed the genus Crocus in his Ordo (family) Irides or Les iris, as a member of the class Stamina epigyna (stamens inserted above the ovary) as part of the monocotyledons, the first level of the division of the flowering plants. 

One of the first monographs of the genus appeared in 1809, by Haworth, followed in 1829 by that of Sabine, and Herbert in 1847. In 1853, Lindley continued the placement of Crocus as one of 53 genera in Iridaceae, which he included in a higher order of monocotyledons, the Narcissales. Baker published a monograph on the genus in 1874, adopting a very different schema to that of Herbert. In 1883, Bentham and Hooker described the Irideae (Iridaceae) as having more than 700 species, and divided it into 3 tribes and further into subtribes. Tribe Sysyrinchieae as having 2 subtribes, including Ixieae. The latter was circumscribed with four genera, Crocus, Syringodea, Galaxia (Moraea) and Romulea. This circumscription has remained stable since, with the exception of Moraea which properly belongs in a separate tribe. The most influential monograph of the nineteenth century was that of Maw (1886), which forms the basis of modern understanding of the genus. Maw built oin the work of Herbert, rejecting Baker's classification. The availability of molecular phylogenetic methods in the late twentieth century has shown that the Iridaceae properly belong within the order Asparagales.

Botanical illustration 

The scientific study of the genus in the late eighteenth century was accompanied by detailed descriptions with Botanical illustrations, such as those of William Curtis (1787) and Sims (1803), that appeared in Curtis' Botanical Magazine, with illustrations by Sydenham Edwards. Other illustrations are found in monographs such as those of Haworth (1809) and Sabine (1830), illustrated by Charles John Robertson. The largest collection is found in the most comprehensive monograph, that of Maw (1886). other sources include the portfolios of plates, such as the survey of the plants of France by Masclef (1891). At that time only C. sativus and C. vernus were included in the Flora of France.

Phylogeny 

The genus Crocus belongs to the monocot family Iridaceae (iris family), specifically the large subfamily Crocoideae. Within that subfamily, crocus is placed on the tribe, Ixieae (synonym Croceae), one of five. The Ixieae are then subdivided into subtribes, with the genera Crocus, Romulea and Syringodea forming subtribe Romuleinae. The Romuleinae have been characterised within the Ixieae by progressively reduced aerial stems.  solitary flowers on the stem branches and woody tunics on the corms. They also often have divided style branches. However Crocus corm tunics are fibrous and membranous rather than woody as in Syringodea, also Crocus has a ridged and often keeled abaxial leaf surface, while that of Syringodea is rounded, and the midline adaxial translucency of Crocus is lacking in Syringodea. Romulea is principally distinguished from the other two genera by generally having aerial stems or at least an ovary at ground level, compared with the other acaulescent genera, other differences include unifacial rather than bifacial leave and the pollen structure.

Within the Romuleinae, Crocus is a sister group to Syringodea, the two genera forming a sister group to Romulea.

Subdivision 

The genus Crocus consists of about 200 accepted species, which continue to increase, and has undergone a large number of taxonomic classifications. The genus has often been divided into sections, beginning with that of Haworth (1809) who described two sections based on the presence or absence of hairs in the throat of the flower, while Sabine was the first to realise the importance of the presence or absence of a basal spathe (prophyll) in dividing the genus into two sections, a practice followed by Herbert However Sabine's practice of using trinomials for varieties such as C. sulphureus concolor is no longer accepted, although Herbert somewhat similarly used varieties and subvarieties, eg C. vernus var.1 Communis subvar. 1. Obovatus. Herbert also used geographical distribution as a basis of classification. By the late 19th century Maw (1886), following Herbert, subdivided the genus into two divisions, the Involucrati and the Nudiflori, and then further divided it into six sections and lastly by flowering times (spring or autumn). Although rejecting the concept of subvarieties, he placed even more emphasis on geography.

The most widely accepted system, that proposed by Brian Mathew in 1982 was based on Maw's system, but with less emphasis on flowering times. This mainly depended on three character states: 
 the presence or absence of a prophyll (a basal spathe);
 the aspect of the style;
 the corm tunic. 
and included 81 species, however, one of these, Crocus medius was later recognized as a synonym of Crocus nudiflorus.

The genus, as described by Mathew, consisted of two subgenera, Crocirus (monotypic for Crocus banaticus) and Crocus including the remainder of the species, based on whether the anthers were introrse or extrorse (dehiscence directed towards or away from centre of flower) respectively. Subgenus Crocus was then divided into two sections, Crocus and Nudiscapus, based on the presence or absence of the prophyll. Each section was then further divided into six series of Crocus and nine of Nudiscapus. These series were defined by the division of the style, the corm tunic, flowering time, leaf structure, presence of a bracteole and anther colour. Mathew also introduced the concept of subspecies, including 50 in all, by giving similar but different forms subspecies status if geographically separated, resulting in about 140 distinct taxa. The seven species and ten subspecies discovered since then have been integrated into revisions of this classification, though new species continue to be described, leading to estimates of at least 200 species.

Speciation 

Crocus populations have extremely high infra-specific variability with a very diverse spectrum of morphological and phenotypical varieties, while many individual specimens from different species may closely resemble each other. Based on such morphological differences between isolated populations many new species have been named, but without a definition of new species based on molecular and/or karyological information, species can not be confirmed, creating difficulties in determining speciation and hence the exact number of species. The situation is even more complex once hybridisation (combination of taxa) and introgression (transfer of genetic material) are considered.

Molecular phylogeny 

The availability of molecular phylogeny methods revealed problems with the traditional systems based on morphology alone. The first analysis of the complete genus was carried out by Mathew and colleagues in 2008 using nucleotide sequences from plastid regions. In particular, the DNA data suggest there are no grounds for isolating C. banaticus in its own subgenus Crociris, though it is a unique species in the genus. Because it has a prophyll at the base of the pedicel, it therefore would fall within section Crocus, although its exact relationship to the rest of the subgenus remains unclear.

Of the 15 series in the Mathew scheme, only seven were monophyletic, and in particular the largest series, Biflori and Reticulati, which include a third of all species, were non-monophyletic. Another anomalous species, C. baytopiorum, should now be placed in a series of its own, series Baytopi. C. gargaricus subsp. herbertii has been raised to species status, as C. herbertii. The autumn-flowering C. longiflorus, the type species of series Longiflori (long regarded by Mathew as "a disparate assemblage"), appeared to lie within series Verni. In addition, the position of C. malyi was currently unclear.

DNA analysis and morphological studies suggest further that series Reticulati, Biflori and Speciosi are "probably inseparable", C. adanensis and C. caspius should probably be removed from Biflori, C. adanensis falls in a clade with C. paschei as a sister group to the species of series Flavi and C. caspius appears to be sister to the species of series Orientales.

The study showed "no support for a system of sections as currently defined", although, despite the many inconsistencies between Mathew's 1982 classification and the current hypothesis, "the main assignment of species to the sections and series of that system is actually supported". The authors state, "further studies are required before any firm decisions about a hierarchical system of classification can be considered" and conclude "future re-classification is likely to involve all infrageneric levels, subgenera, sections and series". A further study, using the internal transcribed spacer region (ITS) of the nuclear ribosomal DNA (rDNA), together with a chloroplast marker, broadly confirmed these findings.

Crocus forms a monophyletic clade, with a basal polytomy of four subclades. The first clade (A) corresponding to section Crocus, but including C. sieberi and several closely related species (originally included in section Nudiscapus series Reticulati). The remaining three clades (B-D) include all the remaining species of section Nudiscapus. Of these, B and C are small, corresponding to series Orientales and Carpetani respectively, with all remaining series in the large D clade. The exception is C. caspius, originally in series Biflori, which segregates in clade B. Thus, although division of the genus into two sections is well supported, no single morphological character defines these two groups. The C. sieberi group are assumed to have lost their prophyll secondarily. Of the series, eight could be shown to be monophyletic; Crocus, Kotschyani and Scardici (section Crocus) and Aleppici, Carpetani, Laevigati, Orientalis and Speciosi (section Nudiscapus). Flowering season did not correspond to molecular groupings and nor did any of the previously used morphological characteristics, indicating a high degree of homoplasy, in which traits are gained or lost independently in different lineages. The remainder of the series could not be supported as natural groupings. Mathew's concept of subspecies status within C. biflorus could not be supported, each being considered a separate species, resulting in the genus having at least 150 species.

A more detailed molecular and morphological study of series Verni (section Crocus) allowed it to be better characterised and circumscribed, as well as the closely related series Longiflori. Series Verni sensu Mathew was found to consist of two groups, the first being C. vernus sensu Mathew and the other consisting of C. etruscus, ilvensis, kosaninii and longiflorus. The taxonomic status of C. vernus had been uncertain for some time, given the observation that the name was more properly applied to C. albiflorus, requiring a new designation of C. neapolitanus for those previously known as C. vernus. Subsequently C. vernus was split into 5 separate species. The incorporation of C. longiflorus into series Verni resulted in making series Longiflori no longer a legitimate taxonomic unit.

In section Nudiscapus, series Reticulati was polyphyletic with species intermingled with series Biflori and Speciosi, requiring a recircumscription, confining Reticulati to 8 species, to obtain monophyly. Among the thereby displaced species, are a number of very closely related taxa, referred to as the Crocus sieberi aggregate, which has been proposed as a new series Sieberi. Other new series, such as Isauri and Lyciotauri, continue to be created out of the Biflori series.

Mathew's circumscription of Crocus introduced the rank of subspecies, of which the largest number (14) were those of Crocus biflorus Miller, the type species of series Biflori, a number which continued to grow. Molecular methods identified these as a polyphyletic assemblage rather than closely related subordinate infraspecific taxa. This necessitated a complete taxonomic revision of series Biflori, elevating each subspecies to species status. A similar issue occurs with C. reticulatus sensu Mathew, who created two subspecies, resulting in 9 newly defined species.

Sections and species 

The classification of Brian Mathew (1982), as amended in 2009 divides the genus into two sections, further divided by series. The number of series, continues to evolve. 
 Section Crocus B.Mathew
Species with a basal prophyll. Type species C. sativus L.
 6 series
 Section Nudiscapus B.Mathew
Species without a basal prophyll. Type species C. reticulatus Stev. ex Adams
 9 series

Similarly named species 

Some crocus species, known as "autumn crocus", flower in late summer and autumn, during (autumnal) rains, after summer's heat and drought, the name autumn crocus is also often used as a common name for Colchicum, which is in its own family (Colchicaceae) in the lily order Liliales. Colchicum are also known as meadow saffron, though unlike true saffron, the plants are toxic. Crocus species have three stamens while Colchicum species have six stamens. In addition, crocus have one style, while Colchicum have three.

Some Pulsatilla species are also called "prairie crocus" (previously Anemone patens) or "wild crocus", but they belong to the buttercup family (Ranunculaceae). Pulsatilla species, which are commonly called pasqueflowers, in contrast to crocus's, have rhizomes, the foliage is covered with long soft hairs, and the flowers are produced on above-ground stems.

Etymology 

"Crocus", the name of the genus is Late Middle English (late 14th century) and also denotes saffron. It is derived via Latin crocus from the Greek κρόκος (krokos). This, in turn, is probably a loan word from a Semitic language, related to Hebrew כרכום karkōm, Aramaic ܟܟܘܪܟܟܡܡܐ kurkama, and Arabic  kurkum, meaning saffron (Crocus sativus), "saffron yellow" or turmeric (see Curcuma), another yellow dye. The word ultimately traces back to the Sanskrit kunkumam for "saffron". The English name is a learned 16th-century adoption from the Latin, but Old English already had croh for saffron, introduced by the Romans.

Distribution and habitat 
Crocuses are distributed from the Mediterranean, from the Iberian peninsula and North Africa, through central and southern Europe, the islands of the Aegean, the Middle East and across central and southwest Asia to Xinjiang in western China, but most species are restricted to Turkey and Asia Minor and the Balkans, with the Balkan Peninsula having the largest number of species ( with at least 31), forming the centre of diversity, however they are widely introduced. The distribution of species is described over five contiguous areas from west to east (see map). 

Habitats range from sea level as high as subalpine altitudes, and in a wide range of habitats from woodlands to meadows and deserts, often on stony mountain slopes with good drainage. The majority of species are native to areas with cold winters and hot summers with little rain, and active growth is typically from fall to mid-spring. The natural habitats of crocus species are threatened by human activities, including urbanization, industrialization, and other land disturbances and recreational uses. They are negatively impacted by uncontrolled gathering and heavy grazing by livestock.

Ecology 

The life cycle of Crocus species begins with the seed, germinating to a seedling, and a mature plant in 3–5 years, however seeds may remain dormant in the soil for several years. The germination stages was first described and illustrated by Maw in his 1886 monograph. In its first year, the crocus produces only a single leaf and creates a corm covered by a thin tunic, about 5–8 mm in size, dependent on the species. In the northern hemisphere, the autumnal crocuses flower between September and November. The vernal (spring) crocuses flowering time depends both on climate and habitat, but is usually mid-winter to spring. Leaves may be synanthous (produced during flowering) or hysteranthous (when the flowers wither away). In the summer, with hot and dry conditions the plant becomes dormant, with all the above ground parts dying back. Colder temperatures in winter then activate the corms. Propagation occurs sexually by seed and asexually by small corms, called cormels or cormlets, produced in the axils of the corms (between tunic scales and body of corm). As the fruit capsule ripens, it emerges from the soil at the base of the flowering stem before dehiscing (splitting open) and releasing the seeds. Seed dispersal may be enhanced by ants, at least in species with arillate seeds.

At night and in overcast weather, the perianth closes. The ovary produces nectar which attracts bees (particularly female bumblebees) and Lepidoptera.

Pests and diseases 

Cultivated plants may have their corms consumed by mice and other rodents, including voles, squirrels, and chipmunks; they are also attacked by mildew, gray mold, botrytis, and fusarium rot; root rot may also occur, caused by Stromatinia gladioli and Pythium species - the nematode Pratylenchus penetrans may also cause root rot. Viruses that are known to infect Crocus spp include: Potyviruses, especially bean yellow mosaic virus and  also tobacco rattle virus, tobaccos necrosis virus, and cucumber mosaic virus. The foliage may experience rot, rust, and scab diseases and be fed upon by aphids, mites, snails, and slugs. The foliage is eaten by hares, rabbits, and deer; the flowers are sometimes removed by birds, including crows, jackdaws, and magpies.

Cultivation

Saffron 

The economic importance of the genus is largely dependent on the single species, Crocus sativus, now known only in cultivation. C. sativus is grown for the production of saffron, an orange-red derivative of its dried stigma, and among the most expensive spices in the world. The estimated worldwide production of C. sativus plants is 205 tons. About 180,000 stigmas from 60,000 flowers are required to produce  saffron, which sells for about $10,000US (2018). Modern saffron production is widely cultivated in Kashmir, Iran, Turkey, Afghanistan and the Mediterranean from Spain to Asia Minor. An important center is the eponymous town of Krokos, in the Kozani region of Greece. The saffron product, Krokos Kozanis is a PDO (Protected Designation of Origin). production is largely indigenous and Iran accounts for 65% of global production, covering 72,162 ha.

Saffron is thought to have been used in embalming in Ancient Egypt. it is mentioned in the Old testament, in the Song of Songs as a precious spice and has featured as a dye and fragrance throughout written history, with mention in The Iliad.

Cultivation and harvesting of C. sativus for saffron was first documented in the Mediterranean, notably on the island of Crete. Frescos showing them are found there at the Bronze Age Minoan site of Knossos, as well as from the comparably aged Akrotiri site on the Aegean island of Santorini, and formed an important part of the Minoan economy and culture and had both a sacred role and use as a psychoactive drug and food additive. Women still gather crocuses in the Akrotiri region.

Horticulture and floriculture 

Crocuses were described in Turkish gardens in the early sixteenth century, gathered from the far reaches of the Ottoman Empire, where they were seen by visiting European botanists and explorers, among the first of whom was Pierre Belon who arrived in Constantinople in 1547. The first crocus seen in the Netherlands, where crocus species were not native, were from corms brought to Vienna in 1562 from Constantinople by the Holy Roman Emperor's ambassador to the Sublime Porte, Ogier Ghiselin de Busbecq. A few corms were forwarded to Carolus Clusius at the botanical garden in Leiden. These were almost certainly cultivated varieties rather than wild species. European visitors to Turkey continued to bring back specimens for gardens in their own country. Prominent among the latter were the gardens at Middelburg in the Netherlands. Jehan Somer, a Middelburg merchant, brought back crocuses among his other specimens in 1592, where they attracted the attention not only of Clusius but of the early Dutch flower painters, notably Ambrosius Bosschaert. By 1620, new garden varieties had been developed, and featured in contemporary illustrations, such as that of Crispijn van de Passe in his Hortus floridus of 1614. and there are accounts of crocus gardens in the seventeenth century, such as the Saffron Garth of Walter Stonehouse at Darfield, Yorkshire.

Crocuses are among the most important ornamental geophytes in the global flower industry, ranking sixth in terms of Dutch bulb production (2003–2008) with 463–668 ha under cultivation. The crocus is one of the most popular flowers found in the garden in the late winter and early spring. About 30 of the species are cultivated, among the most popular being C. chrysanthus, C. flavus, C. sieberi, C. tommasinianus and C. vernus, together with hundreds of cultivars derived from them. Both fall and spring blooming crocus's are cultivated for their flowers. Among the first flowers to bloom in spring, their flowering time can vary from fall to the late winter blooming C. tommasinianus; the earliest fall blooming species, C. scharojanii, may flower during the last weeks of July.

The varieties cultivated for decoration in gardens and pots mainly represent six species: C. vernus, C. chrysanthus, C. flavus, C. sieberi, C. speciosus and C. tommasinianus. During the horticulture production year 2009/2010, more than 70 cultivars were grown in Holland, covering an area of 366 hectares; the most common ones were 'Flower Record' and 'King of the Stripes' which accounted for 42 hectares, other species grown included C. chrysanthus, C. tommasinianus, and C. flavus - all are spring blooming plants. But the most commonly grown plants are the Dutch hybrids with large flowers in a rich palette of colors.

Both sexual and asexual means are used to increase the number of plants; seeds and multiplication of corms are the most common means of production, but tissue culture can be used, most commonly for saffron crocus. New corms are formed on top of the older corm which withers away, and cormels are produced from axillary buds. The production of new plants begins with harvested corms in late June to early July, after being graded by corm size the corms are stored around 22 Celsius until early October when they are moved to 17 Celsius until planted later in October and November; flowering occurs in March and the flowers are not removed. Crocuses are also forced to produce flowering plants out of season and the most common species used are C. vernus and C. flavus, and most of the corms used for forcing come from the Netherlands.

Spring flowering types are planted in fall, while fall-blooming types in late summer; typically, the corms are placed 3 to 4 inches deep in well-draining soil in areas with full sun exposure. They do not thrive in heavy clay soils or those that are damp, especially during their summer dormancy period. Commercial crops are produced on raised beds and slopes, to ensure adequate drainage, while horticulturalists often plant on sand beds for the same purpose. Spring flowering types also do well in areas with deciduous trees, where they flower and produce leaves before the trees completely leaf-out. Crocuses are grown in USDA winter zones 3–8.  Not all species are hardy in the upper zones; C. sativus is winter hardy in USDA zones 6 through 8, and C. pulchellus is hardy in zones 5 through 8.

Some are suitable for naturalizing in grass, but mowing off the foliage before it turns yellow produces short lived plants. Some crocuses, especially C. tommasinianus and its selected forms and hybrids (such as 'Whitewell Purple' and 'Ruby Giant'), seed prolifically and are ideal for naturalizing. They can, however, become weeds in rock gardens, where they will often appear in the middle of choice, mat-forming alpine plants, and can be difficult to remove. Crocus flowers and leaves are protected from frost by a waxy cuticle; in areas where snow and frost occasionally occur in the early spring, it is not uncommon to see early flowering crocuses blooming through a light late snowfall.

Autumn crocus

Autumn-flowering species of crocus that are cultivated include:

C. laevigatus has a long flowering period which starts in late autumn or early winter and may continue into February.

Uses 

The corms of crocuses have been used as foodstuffs in Syria. The carotenoids found in the styles of Crocus species, particularly C. sativus have been shown to inhibit cancer cell proliferation, and have led to interest in potential pharmaceutical applications.

Culture 

The crocus or krokos has been known since ancient times, and used in decorative arts, such as the Minoan wall paintings in Santorini from ca. 1,600 BC. Representations of the saffron crocus appear frequently in Minoan art[and pervade Aegean art from the Early Bronze Age to the Mycenaean period. Theophrastos (4th century BC) described the saffron crocus as being valued as a spice and dye, while Homer compares a sunrise to the flower colour. Saffron coloured robes were much admired by women in antiquity and gave the garment Crocota its name. The oil was also valued as a cosmetic. According to Greek legend Crocus or Krokus, was a mortal youth the gods turned into a plant bearing his name, the crocus, after his death caused by his great desire and unfulfilled love for the shepherdess Smilax. Other versions state that as he died three tears fell into the flower becoming its three stigmata.

Crocuses occur in many flower paintings, one of the earliest being that of Ambrosius Bosschaert's Composed Bouquet of Spring Flowers (1620). In this painting the cream-colored crocus feathered with bronze at the base of the bouquet reflected varieties on the market at that time. Bosschaert, working from a preparatory drawing to paint his composed piece spanning the whole of spring, exaggerated the crocus so that it passes for a tulip, but its narrow, grass-like leaves give it away. 
  
The crocus is used in many contexts to symbolically denote spring and new beginnings. For instance, it was used as the emblem of the 2019 FIFA U-20 World Cup in Poland to symbolise the emergence of new talent.

Notes

References

Bibliography

Books

Gardening, horticulture and floriculture

Dictionaries and encyclopedias 

 , (link note|note=see also Online Etymology Dictionary
 ,

Historical sources (chronological) 

Antiquity
 
14th century 
 
16th century
 
 
  (Internet Archive version: also here at Botanicus and here at Biodiversity Heritage Library)
17th century
 
 
18th century
 , see also Species Plantarum
 
 
19th century

Chapters 

 , in 
 , in 
 , in

Articles

Phylogeny and taxonomy

Novel taxa

Historical accounts

Websites

Organisations and collections

Databases and flora 

  
 List of Crocus species
 Flora of China
 , in Flora of China online vol. 24
 , in Flora of China online vol. 6

External links 

 
Iridaceae genera
Garden plants
Cormous plants